The bold-striped robust slider (Lerista gerrardii)  is a species of skink found in Western Australia.

References

Lerista
Reptiles described in 1864
Taxa named by John Edward Gray